Somewhere in France is a 1916 silent era war espionage drama motion picture starring Louise Glaum and Howard C. Hickman.
 
Directed by Charles Giblyn and produced by Thomas H. Ince, the screenplay was adapted by J. G. Hawks based on the 1915 novel of the same title by Richard Harding Davis, which was also serialized in The Saturday Evening Post.
 
The production companies for Somewhere in France were the New York Motion Picture Company and Kay-Bee Pictures. It was distributed through the Triangle Film Corporation.
 
Glaum brings her femme fatale persona of a vamp (woman) to this feature length war drama.

Plot
An evil French woman, Marie Chaumontel (played by Glaum), is a spy for the Germans during World War I. She vamps and seduces officers of the French high command, accumulating state secrets and then discarding her lovers.
 
Chaumontel is the mistress of Captain Henry Ravignac (played by Storm). She steals some papers from him and gives them to the Germans, then escapes to Berlin. He is tried and found guilty of neglect. He then commits suicide. His brother, Lieutenant Charles Ravignac (played by Hickman), vows revenge on Chaumontel. Pretending to be a spy, he goes to work for the Germans and becomes her assistant. He poses as a chauffeur of her phony countess.
 
When he gathers enough evidence against her, he turns the information over to the Allies. Chaumontel is arrested by French authorities for her foul deeds and sent to prison. He is then hailed as a hero for damaging German espionage operations.

Cast in credits order
Louise Glaum as Marie Chaumontel
Howard C. Hickman as Lt. Charles Ravignac
Joseph J. Dowling as Gen. Andres
Fanny Midgley as Madame Benet
Jerome Storm as Capt. Henry Ravignac
George Fisher as Herr Vogel
William Fairbanks as Capt. Pierre Thierry

External links

Somewhere in France at the AFI Catalog of Feature Films
 

1916 films
American war drama films
American silent feature films
World War I spy films
American black-and-white films
1910s war drama films
Triangle Film Corporation films
Films based on American novels
Films set in France
1916 drama films
Films directed by Charles Giblyn
1910s American films
Silent American drama films
Silent war drama films